Tracy Illya Johnson (born November 29, 1966) is a former National Football League (NFL) running back.

He attended Kings Mountain High School (1982–1984), before transferring to A.L. Brown High School for his senior season.

External links
NFL.com player page

1966 births
Living people
People from Concord, North Carolina
American football running backs
Clemson Tigers football players
Houston Oilers players
Atlanta Falcons players
Seattle Seahawks players
Tampa Bay Buccaneers players